The Best Of Manfred Mann's Earth Band Re-Mastered Volume II is a compilation album released in 2001 by Manfred Mann's Earth Band.

Track listing 
"The Times They Are a-Changin'" (live) (Bob Dylan) – 6:30
"Eyes Of Nostradamus" (7" single) (Al Stewart) – 3:37
"Shelter from the Storm" (Dylan) – 6:05
"Time Is Right" (6:32)  (Manfred Mann, Chris Slade, Mick Rogers) – 6:32
"Tribal Statistics" (single) (Andy Qunta) – 3:35
"I (Who Have Nothing)" (single) (Jerry Leiber, Mike Stoller) – 4:12
"Man In A Jam" (Mann) – 2:10
"Martha's Madman" (Lane Tietgen) – 4:51
"Father Of Day, Father Of Night" (single) (Dylan) – 3:05
"Tumbling Ball" (single) (Mark Spiro) – 3:59
"Meat" (Mann) – 3:14
"It's All Over Now, Baby Blue" (single) (Dylan) – 3:06
"Black and Blue" (Chain: Barry Sullivan, Matt Taylor, Phil Manning, Barry Harvey) – 7:20
"Tribute" (single) (Mann) – 4:09
"Do Anything You Wanna Do" (12" single) (Graham Douglas, Edwin Hollis) – 6:27
"Singing The Dolphin Through" (Mike Heron) – 8:16
"Joybringer" (1987 version) (Gustav Holst, Mann, Rogers, Slade) – 2:29

Re-mastered by: Robert M Corich and Mike Brown
Best of Compilation by Andy Taylor

Personnel 
Manfred Mann - keyboards, vocals
with various Manfred Mann's Earth Band members 1972-2000

References

Manfred Mann's Earth Band albums
2001 greatest hits albums